Shaoshan–Shaoshan Interchange Expressway is a major expressway of Hunan province, China, linking the cities of Xiangtan, Shaoshan and Ningxiang. Construction of the expressway commenced in December 26 2004 and was completed in December 24 2008.

Route
 Xiangtan County
 Shaoshan
 Ningxiang

Scenic spots
 Former Residence of Mao Zedong
 Former Residence of Liu Shaoqi

References

Expressways in Hunan
Expressways in Changsha
Expressways in Xiangtan
2008 establishments in China